Julian Bennett (May 3, 1929 – October 27, 2013) was a Democratic politician and a member of the Florida House of Representatives for Bay County (1961–1966). He was born in Panama City, Florida.

He was a Presbyterian. In 1951, he received an LLB from Stetson University. He served in the Infantry of the United States Army from 1951 - 1952. From 1952 to 1954, he served as a lieutenant in the Judge Advocate Generals office. He was elected to the Florida House in 1960. On October 27, 2013, he died in Panama City at the age of 84.

Sources

Morris, Allen, compiler. The Florida Handbook 1963-1964. pg 149. Peninsula Publishing. Tallahassee. 1963.

Democratic Party members of the Florida House of Representatives
1929 births
2013 deaths
20th-century American lawyers
Stetson University alumni
20th-century American politicians